Klyuchevoye is a rural locality (a selo) in Mukhinsky Selsoviet of Shimanovsky District, Amur Oblast, Russia. The population was 363 as of 2018. There is 1 street.

Geography 
Klyuchevoye is located 66 km northwest of Shimanovsk (the district's administrative centre) by road. Mukhino is the nearest rural locality.

References 

Rural localities in Shimanovsky District